"I Am" is the debut single by folktronica musician Crowder from his debut album, Neon Steeple. It was released on November 25, 2013 by sixstepsrecords and Sparrow Records, and it was co-written and co-produced by Ed Cash and Crowder.

Background 
The single was co-written by Crowder and Ed Cash. The song was recorded just after Cash had work with a choir group of orphans from Uganda, and this led to the lyrics in the first verse of the song.

Release 
"I Am" was digitally released as the lead single from Neon Steeple on November 25, 2013 by sixstepsrecords and Sparrow Records.

Weekly charts

References 

2013 debut singles
2013 songs
Crowder (musician) songs
Songs written by Ed Cash
Sparrow Records singles